Kim Dong-yeon (born 28 January 1957) is a South Korean politician serving as 36th governor of Gyeonggi Province since 1 July 2022. He previously served as the 4th Minister of Economy and Finance and Deputy Prime Minister from 2017 to 2018.

Kim was a candidate for the 2022 South Korean presidential election as an independent, with the endorsement of Period Transition and the formation of his own Party, the New Wave.

Early life 
After completion of high school, he worked as a banker at Seoul Trust Bank (which is now KEB Hana Bank) while completing his undergraduate degree in law at the evening school of Kookjae University.

He spent most of his time in government at Ministry of Economy and Finance and its preceding agencies where he began and ended his career in public service at.

In 1982 he passed the state exams for both legal affairs and administration and began working as a working-level administrator at its preceding agency. He took numerous economy and budgeting related roles in government ministries, Office of the President and presidential transition team.

He was recruited by three consecutive presidents. He was Lee Myung-bak's second vice finance minister and Park Geun-hye's minister for government policy coordination. Before promoted to Moon Jae-in's first finance minister, he was the 15th president of Ajou University for two years.

Kim holds four degrees - a bachelor in law from Kookjae University, two master's in administration from Seoul National University and University of Michigan and a doctorate in administration from University of Michigan.

In 2022, he was elected as the 36th governor of Gyeonggi Province during the 2022 South Korean local elections by a very narrow margin of 0.15%.

References

Living people
1957 births
People from North Chungcheong Province
Seokyeong University alumni
Seoul National University alumni
University of Michigan alumni
Government ministers of South Korea
Centrism in Asia
Finance ministers of South Korea
Deputy Prime Ministers of South Korea
Presidents of universities and colleges in South Korea
Governors of Gyeonggi Province